The Poudingue Ferrugineux is a geologic formation in France. It preserves fossils dating back to the Albian stage of the Cretaceous period. It predominantly consists of conglomerate, deposited in shallow marine conditions. It is exposed at Cap de la Hève at Le Havre,  Normandy. The dinosaur Normanniasaurus is known from the formation.

See also

 List of fossiliferous stratigraphic units in France

References
 

Cretaceous France
Albian Stage
Lower Cretaceous Series of Europe